The 2013–14 Primera División season (known as the Campeonato JPS 2013–14 for sponsorship reasons) is the 95th of Costa Rica's top-flight professional football league. The season was divided into two championships: the Invierno and the Verano. Universidad de Costa Rica is the newly promoted member.

The Invierno season was dedicated to Guillermo Vargas Roldán.

Campeonato de Invierno
The tournament began on 11 August 2013 and will end on 22 December 2013.

First Stage

Standings

Results

Second stage

Semifinals

First legs

Second legs

Finals

First leg

Second leg

Campeonato de Verano
The tournament began on 11 January 2014.

First Stage

Standings

Results

Second stage

Semifinals

First legs

Second legs

Finals

First leg

Second leg

References

Liga FPD seasons
1
Costa